Thae Hyong-chol (born 1953) is a politician and university professor of the Democratic People's Republic of Korea. Since the 12th convocation of the Supreme People's Assembly he is serving as Vice Chairman of the Standing Committee. He previously served as President of Kim Il-sung University from 2013 to 2019, and was the Minister of Higher Education in the Cabinet of North Korea. He is the son of a North Korean general, Thae Byong-ryol.

Biography
Born in 1953 in Pyongyang to Thae Byong-ryol, he graduated from Kim Il-sung University. He started as a researcher at the Institute of Social Sciences in 1977 and was head of the World Economic and South-South Cooperation Research Institute at the Academy of Social Sciences in October 1990 and served as vice president of the Institute of Social Sciences in March 1995. In September 2010, he was elected a candidate for the Central Committee of the Workers' Party of Korea. On April 13, 2012, the 12th 5th session of the Supreme People's Assembly he was elected as the General Secretary of the Presidium of the Supreme People's Assembly replacing Kang Chang-uk. In 2014 he was replaced by Hong Son-ok. In April 2013, he became the President of Kim Il-sung University and became the Minister of Higher Education, succeeding Song Ja-reeb. He was elected as the 10th convocation of the Supreme People's Assembly in September 1998 and the 11th convocation and Presidium of the Supreme People's Assembly in September 2003.

References

Members of the Supreme People's Assembly
Kim Il-sung University alumni
Academic staff of Kim Il-sung University
1953 births
Date of birth missing (living people)
People from Pyongyang
Living people
Alternate members of the 8th Politburo of the Workers' Party of Korea
Members of the 7th Central Committee of the Workers' Party of Korea
Members of the 8th Central Committee of the Workers' Party of Korea